The Little Ferry Circle was a traffic circle connecting U.S. Route 46 and Bergen Turnpike in Little Ferry, Bergen County, New Jersey, United States.

The circle was originally constructed in 1933. It was largely reconstructed in 1985, enabling vehicles traveling on Route 46 to pass directly through the circle. Further improvements in 1998 which involved condemnation of adjacent properties led to a 73-page court decision.

The circle has been a constant site of accidents, with 40-50 accidents there annually from 2004 through 2006.

In March 2007, the New Jersey Department of Transportation proposed its latest plan to address issues at the circle. The plan would realign the circle into a straight intersection, complete with turning lanes; prohibit left turns onto many residential streets; and would include construction of a pump station to move water off the oft-flooded highway and into the Hackensack River.

The circle's redesign was completed in 2016. However, according to the Little Ferry police and business owners at the new intersection, car accidents still occur, though they are less deadly than before. The proprietors at the site also claim to have lost a significant amount of business due to reduced accessibility to their establishments, caused by the redesign and loss of the former circle.

See also
List of traffic circles in New Jersey
Winant Avenue Bridge

References

Little Ferry, New Jersey
Transportation buildings and structures in Bergen County, New Jersey
Traffic circles in New Jersey
U.S. Route 46